The Breakfast Table is a 1958 still life painting by Australian artist John Brack. The painting depicts a table after breakfast but before the plates, cups and cutlery have been cleared.

The viewpoint of the artist is from over the table, laying out the objects in a geometrical pattern with tubular bottles and jars, flat plates, and knives tilted at different angles. The painting foreshadows some of Brack's later workhis 1960s still lifes portraying knives and his allegorical conflict paintings of the 1980s.

Previously part of the Grundy collection, the Art Gallery of New South Wales acquired the work in 2013 for A$1.3 million.

References

External links
The Breakfast Table - Art Gallery of New South Wales

Paintings by John Brack
Collections of the Art Gallery of New South Wales
1958 paintings
Still life paintings
Food and drink paintings